John of Dukla (also called "Jan of Dukla") is a saint in the Roman Catholic Church. He is one of the patron saints of Poland and Lithuania.

Biography
John was born in Dukla, Poland, in 1414.  He joined the Friars Minor Conventual, and studied at Krakow. After being ordained, he preached in Lwów (then part of Poland), Moldavia, and Belerus; and was superior of Lwów. He may have joined the Observants at a time when efforts were being made to unite the two branches of the Franciscans. 

Though he went blind at age seventy, he was able to prepare sermons with the help of an aide. His preaching was credited with bringing people back to the church in his province. Soon after his death, there was an immediate veneration at his tomb and several miracles were attributed to him.

He died in 1484 in Lwów, Poland. On June 10, 1997, he was canonized by Pope John Paul II in a mass at Krosno, Poland, before approximately one million people.

Notes

References

1414 births
1484 deaths
Polish Roman Catholic saints
15th-century Christian saints
Venerated Catholics by Pope John Paul II
People from Dukla
Beatifications by Pope Clement XII
Canonizations by Pope John Paul II
Franciscan saints